François Marie Louis Corbière (10 May 1850, Champsecret – 3 January 1941, Cherbourg) was a French botanist and mycologist.

He worked as a school teacher in the town of Sées, followed by similar duties in Argentan (1869). In 1882 he became a professor of sciences at the lycée in Cherbourg. Here he worked as a conservator at the city's natural history museum and as scientific director of the Parc Emmanuel-Liais. 

In 1907 he became a member of the Société botanique de France, and for a period of time, served as president of the Société d'horticulture de Cherbourg. He was also a member of the Société des sciences naturelles de Cherbourg and the Société linnéenne de Normandie.

Principal works 
 Muscinées du département de la Manche, 1889 – Mosses native to the department of Manche
 Nouvelle flore de Normandie contenant la description des plantes qui croissent spontanément ou sont cultivées en grand dans les départements de La Seine-Inférieure, L'Eure, le Calvados, L'Orne & La Manche, 1893 – New flora of Normandy containing descriptions of native plants and those cultivated on a large-scale in the departments of Seine-Inférieure, Eure, Calvados, Orne and Manche
 Muscinées du Département du Var, 1921 – Mosses native to the department of Var
 Champignons de la Manche, 1929 – Mushrooms native to Manche.

References

External links
 

1850 births
1941 deaths
People from Orne
19th-century French botanists
French mycologists
Bryologists
20th-century French botanists